Bernard Bailyn (September 10, 1922 – August 7, 2020) was an American historian, author, and academic specializing in U.S. Colonial and Revolutionary-era History. He was a professor at Harvard University from 1953.  Bailyn won the Pulitzer Prize for History twice (in 1968 and 1987). In 1998 the National Endowment for the Humanities selected him for the Jefferson Lecture. He was a recipient of the 2010 National Humanities Medal.

He specialized in American colonial and revolutionary-era history, looking at merchants, demographic trends, Loyalists, international links across the Atlantic, and especially the political ideas that motivated the Patriots. He was best known for studies of republicanism and Atlantic history that transformed the scholarship in those fields. He was elected a Fellow of the American Academy of Arts and Sciences in 1963 and a member of the American Philosophical Society in 1971.

Education
Bailyn was born in Hartford, Connecticut in 1922, the son of Esther (Schloss) and Charles Manuel Bailyn. His family was Jewish. Bailyn earned his bachelor's degree from Williams College in 1945 and in 1953 earned his Ph.D from Harvard University. He was associated with Harvard for the rest of his life. As a graduate student at Harvard, he studied under Perry Miller, Samuel Eliot Morison, and Oscar Handlin.  He was made a full professor in 1961, and professor emeritus in 1993.  In 1979, he received an honorary doctorate from Grinnell College in Grinnell, Iowa.

History books
Bernard Bailyn was the author of The Ideological Origins of the American Revolution (1967), which was awarded the Pulitzer Prize for History in 1968. He was the editor of The Apologia of Robert Keayne (1965) and of the two-volume Debate on the Constitution (1993).

He co-authored The Great Republic (1977), an American history textbook, and was co-editor of The Intellectual Migration, Europe and America, 1930–1960 (1969), Law in American History (1972), The Press and the American Revolution (1980), and Strangers Within the Realm: Cultural Margins of the First British Empire (1991).

Major themes and ideas
Bailyn's dissertation and first publications dealt with New England merchants. He argued that international commerce was an uncertain business, given the high risk of losses at sea in the very long turnaround times meant that  information was  often too old to be useful.  Merchants reduced the uncertainty by pooling their resources, especially with  marriages to other merchant families, and placing their kinfolk as trusted agents  in London and other foreign ports.

International commerce became a chief means of growing rich in  colonial Massachusetts. However, there was an ongoing tension between  the entrepreneurial spirit on the one hand  and traditional Puritan culture on the other.   The world of merchants became an engine of social change, undermining the isolationism, scholasticism, and religious zeal of the Puritan leadership. Bailyn pointed the younger generation of historians away from Puritan theology and toward broader social and economic forces. Bailyn expanded his research to the social structure of Virginia, showing how its leadership class was transformed in the 1660s. Like Edmund Morgan at Brown University and Yale, Bailyn emphasized the multiple roles of the family in the colonial social system.

Bailyn is known for meticulous research and for interpretations that sometimes challenge the conventional wisdom, especially those dealing with the causes and effects of the American Revolution. In his most influential work, The Ideological Origins of the American Revolution, Bailyn analyzed pre-Revolutionary political pamphlets to show that colonists believed the British intended to establish a tyrannical state that would abridge the historical British rights. He thus argued that the Revolutionary rhetoric of liberty and freedom was not simply propagandistic but rather central to their understanding of the situation. This evidence was used to displace Charles A. Beard's theory, then the dominant understanding of the American Revolution, that the American Revolution was primarily a matter of class warfare and that the rhetoric of liberty was meaningless.  Bailyn maintained that ideology was ingrained in the revolutionaries, an attitude he said exemplified the "transforming radicalism of the American Revolution."

Bailyn argued that republicanism was at the core of the values French radical thinkers had striven to affirm.  He located the intellectual sources of the American Revolution within a broader British political framework, explaining how English country Whig ideas about civic virtue, corruption, ancient rights, and fear of autocracy were, in the colonies, transformed into the ideology of republicanism.

According to Bailyn,

In Bailyn's assessment, contested libertarian meanings change through time as "the colonists" struggled to define, and to pursue, the property of independence. Recent historians hold that more than any other "colonist," Boston waterfront rebels channeled their "cosmopolitanism into a belief that 'the cause of America' was a libertarian 'cause for all mankind."

In her memorial tribute, Harvard historian Joyce Chaplin noted Bernard Bailyn's resistance to "dichotomies" and his attention to "granular" records and culture.

Social history
In the 1980s, Bailyn turned from political and intellectual history to social and demographic history. His histories of the peopling of colonial North America explored questions of immigration, cultural contact, and settlement that his mentor Handlin had pioneered decades earlier.

Bailyn was a major innovator in new research techniques, such as quantification, collective biography, and kinship analysis.

Bailyn is representative of those scholars who believe in the concept of American exceptionalism but avoid the terminology, and thereby avoid getting entangled in rhetorical debates. According to Michael Kammen and Stanley N. Katz:

Atlantic history
As a leading advocate of Atlantic history, Bailyn organized an annual international seminar on the "History of the Atlantic World" from the mid-1980s onward. Through the seminar, he promoted social and demographic studies, especially regarding flows of population into colonial America.  Bailyn's Atlantic History: Concepts and Contours (2005) explores the borders and contents of the emerging field, which emphasizes cosmopolitan and multicultural elements that have tended to be neglected or considered in isolation by traditional historiography dealing with the Americas.

Personal life
Bailyn was married to MIT Professor of Management Lotte Bailyn (née Lazarsfeld). His two sons are Charles Bailyn, who is an astrophysicist at Yale University, and John Bailyn, a linguist at Stony Brook University.

Bailyn died on August 7, 2020, at his home in Belmont, Massachusetts.  He was 97 and suffered from heart failure.

Students
Former students of Bailyn include Pulitzer Prize winners Michael Kammen, Jack N. Rakove, and Gordon S. Wood, as well as Pulitzer Prize finalist Mary Beth Norton. Other notable Bailyn students include:
 Fred Anderson (Crucible of War and A People's Army);
 Virginia DeJohn Anderson (Creatures of Empire)
Mary Sarah Bilder
 Richard L. Bushman (From Puritan to Yankee);
 Philip J. Greven (The Protestant Temperament, Spare the Child);
 Richard D. Brown (Revolutionary Politics in Massachusetts: The Boston Committee of Correspondence and the Towns, 1772–1774 and Knowledge Is Power: The Diffusion of Information in Early America, 1700–1865);
 Sally E. Hadden (Slave Patrols)
 David Hancock (historian) ("Oceans of Wine: Madeira and the Emergence of American Trade and Taste," "Citizens of the World: London Merchants and the Integration of the British Atlantic Community, 1735–1785)
 James Henretta (Families and farms: Mentalité in Pre-Industrial America);
 Peter Charles Hoffer (Law and People in Colonial America, among others)
Daniel Hulsebosch, Russell D. Niles Professor of Law at New York University School of Law
 Stanley N. Katz (Newcastle's New York)
James Kettner (The Development of American Citizenship, 1608–1870)
David Konig, Washington University in St. Louis professor of law and history
 Pauline Maier (American Scripture on the Declaration and Ratification: The People Debate the Constitution, 1787–1788, winner of the 2011 George Washington Book Prize and the Fraunces Tavern Book Prize);
 William E. Nelson, legal and constitutional historian and Edward Weinfeld Professor of Law at New York University School of Law, author of The Fourteenth Amendment: From Political Principle to Judicial Doctrine (1988), winner of the Littleton-Griswold Prize of the American Historical Association, and many other books
 Daniel Oliver (policymaker), former executive editor of National Review and former chairman of the Federal Trade Commission 
 Jeffrey Pasley (The First Presidential Contest, The Tyranny of Printers, Beyond the Founders
 Mark A. Peterson (The City State of Boston);
George David Smith (practitioner of applied economic and business history and founding partner of The Winthrop Group, Inc.  Anatomy  of a Business Strategy" [Co-winner: Best book on Business and Industry, American Publishers' Assn.]; "From Monopoly to Competition;" "The New Financial Capitalists, with George Baker; History of The Firm [McKinsey & Co.], lead author,
 Peter H. Wood (Black Majority);
 Michael Zuckerman (Peaceable Kingdoms)

Many of these historians have gone on to train a new generation of American historians; others have branched out into fields as diverse as law and the history of science.

See also
 Early American publishers and printers#American Revolution

Bibliography

 
 Massachusetts Shipping, 1697–1714: A Statistical Study (with Lotte Bailyn). Harvard University Press, 1959.
 Education in the Forming of American Society: Needs and Opportunities for Study. University of North Carolina Press, 1960.
  Pamphlets of the American Revolution, 1750-1776, Volume I: 1750-1765, Edited by Bernard Bailyn Jane N. Garrett, Harvard 
 University Press 
  Awarded the Pulitzer Prize and the Bancroft Prize in 1968.
 The Origins of American Politics. Knopf, 1968.
 The Ordeal of Thomas Hutchinson. Harvard University Press, 1974; winner of the 1975 National Book Award in History.
 The Great Republic: A History of the American People. Little, Brown, 1977; coauthored college textbook; several editions.
 The Peopling of British North America: An Introduction. Knopf, 1986.
 Voyagers to the West: A Passage in the Peopling of America on the Eve of the Revolution. Knopf, 1986; won the Pulitzer Prize in History, the Saloutos Award of the Immigration History Society, and distinguished book awards from the Society of Colonial Wars and the Society of the Cincinnati.
 Faces of Revolution: Personalities and Themes in the Struggle for American Independence. Knopf, 1990.
 Bailyn, Bernard, ed. The Debate on the Constitution: Federalist and Antifederalist Speeches, Articles, and Letters During the Struggle for Ratification. Part One: September 1787 to February 1788. Library of America, 1993. 
 Bailyn, Bernard, ed. The Debate on the Constitution: Federalist and Antifederalist Speeches, Articles, and Letters During the Struggle for Ratification. Part Two: January to August 1788. Library of America, 1993. 
 On the Teaching and Writing of History. 1994.
 
 To Begin the World Anew: The Genius and Ambiguities of the American Founders. Knopf, 2003.
 Atlantic History: Concept and Contours. Harvard University Press, 2005.
 The Barbarous Years: The Peopling of British North America: The Conflict of Civilizations, 1600–1675, Alfred A. Knopf, 2012, .
 Sometimes an Art: Nine Essays on History, Alfred A. Knopf, 2015, .

References

Further reading
Boyd, Kelly, ed. Encyclopedia of Historians and Historical Writers (Rutledge, 1999)  1:66–68.
 Coclanis, Peter A. "Drang Nach Osten: Bernard Bailyn, the World-Island, and the Idea of Atlantic History." Journal of World History 13.1 (2002): 169–182.
Ekirch, A. Roger  "Bernard Bailyn," in Clyde N. Wilson, ed. Twentieth-century American Historians  (Gale Research Company, 1983) pp 19–26
 Kammen,  Michael and Stanley N. Katz, "Bernard Bailyn, Historian, and Teacher: An Appreciation." in James A. Henretta, Michael Kämmen, and Stanley N. Katz, eds. The Transformation of Early American History: Society, Authority, and Ideology (1991) pp 3–15
 Rakove, Jack N. "'How Else Could It End?' Bernard Bailyn and the Problem of Authority and Early America."  in James A. Henretta, Michael Kämmen, and Stanley N. Katz, eds. The Transformation of Early American History: Society, Authority, and Ideology (1991) pp 51–69
 Rakove, Jack N. "Bernard Bailyn" in Robert Allen Rutland, ed. "Clio's Favorites: Leading Historians of the United States, 1945–2000" (U of Missouri Press. 2000) pp  5–22.
 Wood, Gordon. "The creative imagination of Bernard Bailyn," in James A. Henretta, Michael Kämmen, and Stanley N. Katz, eds. The Transformation of Early American History: Society, Authority, and Ideology (1991) pp 16–50.

External links

"To Begin the World Anew"-Politics and the Creative Imagination Jefferson Lecture for the National Endowment for the Humanities
Bernard Bailyn: An Appreciation
Considering the Slave Trade: History and Memory
History News Network

"Into the Wilderness: ‘The Barbarous Years,’ by Bernard Bailyn", Charles C. Mann, The New York Times, 4 January 2013

1922 births
2020 deaths
20th-century American historians
20th-century American male writers
21st-century American historians
21st-century American male writers
Academics of the University of Cambridge
Fellows of the American Academy of Arts and Sciences
Foreign Members of the Russian Academy of Sciences
Harvard University alumni
Harvard University faculty
Historians of the American Revolution
Historians of the Thirteen Colonies
Historians of political thought
Jewish American historians
National Book Award winners
National Humanities Medal recipients
Presidents of the American Historical Association
Pulitzer Prize for History winners
Quadrant (magazine) people
Williams College alumni
American male non-fiction writers
Writers from Hartford, Connecticut
Historians from Connecticut
21st-century American Jews
Members of the American Philosophical Society